The New Haven skyline as seen from New Haven Harbor in 2007.

Tallest buildings 
These are the ten tallest buildings in New Haven, Connecticut.

A view of the New Haven skyline in 1919 from the New Haven Green.

Timeline of tallest buildings 
This lists buildings that once held the title of tallest building in New Haven, Connecticut.

Tallest under construction, approved and proposed 
This lists buildings that are under construction, approved for construction or proposed for construction in New Haven.

* Table entries with dashes (—) indicate that information regarding building heights, floor counts, or dates of completion has not yet been released.

References 

New Haven
Tallest in New Haven